Lord Alexander George Boteville Thynne  (17 February 1873 – 14 September 1918) was a British Army officer and Conservative politician.

Thynne was the third and youngest son of John Thynne, 4th Marquess of Bath, and his wife Frances Isabella Catherine (née Vesey). He was commissioned a second lieutenant in the Royal Wiltshire Yeomanry in April 1897. Following the outbreak of the Second Boer War in late 1899, Thynne volunteered for active service and was commissioned a lieutenant in the Imperial Yeomanry on 7 February 1900, leaving Liverpool on the SS Cymric in March 1900 to serve in South Africa with the 1st (Wiltshire) company of the 1st Battalion. He resigned his active commission with the Imperial Yeomanry on 28 July 1902. During the war, he had been promoted a lieutenant in the Royal Wiltshire Yeomanry on 13 June 1900, while still in South Africa. He was later a temporary Lieutenant-Colonel in the Service Battalion of the Wiltshire Regiment and served in the Somaliland campaign of 1903 to 1904.

In the January 1910 general election he was elected to the House of Commons as one of two representatives for Bath.

During the First World War Thynne was twice wounded in the Battle of the Somme in 1916 and awarded the Distinguished Service Order and the Croix de Guerre. He was killed in action in France on 14 September 1918, aged 45, whilst commanding 6th (Royal Wiltshire Yeomanry) Bn. Wiltshire Regiment and was buried at Béthune Town Cemetery. He never married. He is commemorated on Panel 8 of the Parliamentary War Memorial in Westminster Hall, one of 22 MPs that died during World War I to be named on that memorial. Thynne is one of 19 MPs who fell in the war who are commemorated by heraldic shields in the Commons Chamber. A further act of commemoration came with the unveiling in 1932 of a manuscript-style illuminated book of remembrance for the House of Commons, which includes a short biographical account of the life and death of Thynne. Thynne is reported to have been a lover of sculptor Clare Sheridan, a cousin of Winston Churchill. Thynne is also commemorated on the Norton War Memorial and the Great War roll of honour at All Saints Church, Norton, Northamptonshire.

Notes

References

External links 
 

1873 births
1918 deaths
Alexander
Conservative Party (UK) MPs for English constituencies
UK MPs 1910–1918
Wiltshire Regiment officers
British Army personnel of the Second Boer War
British Army personnel of World War I
British military personnel killed in World War I
Companions of the Distinguished Service Order
Recipients of the Croix de Guerre 1914–1918 (France)
Younger sons of marquesses
British military personnel of the Third Somaliland Expedition
Royal Wiltshire Yeomanry officers
Politics of Bath, Somerset
Members of London County Council